is a Japanese manga artist. Her works include Guru Guru Pon-chan, Othello and Sue-chan wa Himitsu. In 2000, she received the Kodansha Manga Award in the shōjo category for Guru Guru Pon-chan.

Works
Anatomy of a Seventeen-Year-Old
Kattobi New Yorker
The Devil and Pure Love
A Girl's Enemy Is Girls
I'm in Trouble Because I've Seen Too Much
Fed Up with Adolescence!
The No-No's of Love and Adolescence
Are You Obsessed?
Angel's Pheromone
Othello
Guru Guru Pon-chan
Guru Guru Pon-chan: Okawari

References

External links
 Official website 
 
 Profile at the Ultimate Manga Page

1962 births
Living people
Women manga artists
Manga artists from Tokyo
Winner of Kodansha Manga Award (Shōjo)
Japanese female comics artists
Female comics writers